is a beat 'em up video game in the Double Dragon series for PlayStation 4, Microsoft Windows, Nintendo Switch, and Xbox One.

Gameplay

In addition to a story mode, the game includes a two-player duel mode and a tower battle mode. Enemies and bosses as well as hidden characters can be unlocked for Story and Duel modes through Tower Mode.

Plot
After the defeat of the Black Warriors in Double Dragon II, Billy and Jimmy Lee look to spread their Sōsetsuken martial art by establishing dojos around the country. However, they soon face a new threat in a gang called the Renegades, who have teamed up with the Black Warriors to put an end to Billy and Jimmy once and for all.

Development
Unlike earlier games in the series, this sequel is developed by Arc System Works, who bought the series rights in 2015 after acquiring the original publisher Technōs Japan. Several series developers continued to the project, including the original director, character designer, and composer with production led by Arc System Works designer Takaomi Kaneko. The game was announced in late December 2016 via a gameplay trailer. GameSpot had expected a graphical update, similar to Double Dragon Neon, but the new sequel's gameplay and graphics are more akin to the ports made for the Nintendo Entertainment System, with several character sprites taken directly from those titles, rather than the arcade original.

Producer Takaomi Kaneko said the team made the decision use Double Dragon II for the NES as a template because the game sported the same visuals in Japan and the rest of the world. Composer Kazunaka Yamane based the soundtrack on the original NES Double Dragon games he had worked on in the past, although at first he could not find his original compositions for the past games. His new music was subsequently converted to a retro 8-bit style soundtrack that is available as an option in the game. Similarly, character design Koji Ogata, who had also worked on Double Dragon II: The Revenge also tried to preserve the classic graphics from the older game, while adding new animations and backgrounds. The game's development team had only five members, a smaller team than the ones that worked on the NES titles.

The game was released digitally on January 30, 2017, for PlayStation 4 and January 31 for Microsoft Windows. A version for Nintendo Switch was released digitally on September 7. The game received a limited physical release on the PlayStation 4 on December 8 the same year, and on 2022 on Nintendo Switch by Limited Run Games.

Reception

According to video game review aggregator Metacritic, the PS4 has a score of 49, indicating "generally unfavorable reviews", while the PC version has a score of 50, indicating "mixed or average reviews". Destructoid gave it a 6/10, praising the retro aesthetic. IGN awarded it a score of 3.5/10.

References

External links
 
 Double Dragon IV at MobyGames

2017 video games
Arc System Works games
Android (operating system) games
Beat 'em ups
Double Dragon
IOS games
Multiplayer and single-player video games
Nintendo Switch games
PlayStation 4 games
Retro-style video games
Video game sequels
Interquel video games
Video games about siblings
Video games developed in Japan
Windows games
Xbox One games